My Lucky Stars is a 1985 Hong Kong action comedy film directed by Sammo Hung, written by Barry Wong, and starring Hung, Jackie Chan and Yuen Biao. It was released as 5 Lucky Stars in Japan and as Ninja Encounter in the Philippines. My Lucky Stars is the second film in the Lucky Stars series, and a semi-sequel to Winners and Sinners, with many of the same actors returning as the "Five Lucky Stars" troupe, albeit with different character names and slightly different roles.

Plot summary
Undercover cop Muscles (Jackie Chan) enlists his childhood friends, the "Five Lucky Stars", to travel to Japan to help him catch a Yakuza group.

A corrupt Hong Kong cop (Lam Ching Ying) flees to Tokyo to join his fellow mobsters, whose headquarters are secretly built under an amusement park (filmed in Fuji-Q Highland). Two loyal cops, Ricky (Yuen Biao) and Muscle (Jackie Chan), travel there to apprehend him and uncover the mobsters’ lair, but Ricky is kidnapped in a fight. Muscle goes into hiding and calls his supervisor to send help; since the mobsters already have information on the officers of the Hong Kong Royal Police Force, Muscle asks to send his orphanage friends, nicknamed the Five Lucky Stars, over to assist. The supervisor agrees and collects the five friends, who are all either petty criminals or low-wage workers. They refuse to aid the police, but the supervisor cunningly sets up a false story in the media that accuses the five of robbing a bank of millions of dollars, blackmailing them into helping. They ultimately agree when the supervisor teams them up with a rookie policewoman, Swordflower, who becomes an object of lustful target to the five. They travel to Tokyo and that night, Kidstuff (Sammo Hung), the Stars' most rational and talented member, and Swordflower go to Muscle’s apartment. After defeating some thugs, Muscle reunites with Kidstuff. The operation is to send phony money to the mobsters to allow the five to enter their lair, and that way they can get closer to freeing Ricky and apprehending the criminals. After a prolonged battle at the bowels of the amusement park, the criminals lose and the Lucky Stars receive a place to live back at Hong Kong as their reward.

Cast
Despite being billed as one of the stars, Jackie Chan's role in the film is relatively minor until the final half hour. The major star of the film is Chan's longtime associate and former member of the Peking Opera School, Sammo Hung. The film also features another of that troupe, Yuen Biao.

In the first film, Winners and Sinners, Stanley Fung played an undercover policeman who was posing as the leader of the Lucky Stars gang. In My Lucky Stars and the third film, Twinkle, Twinkle Lucky Stars, Hung's character is the nominal leader, and Fung's character is not a cop.

John Shum ("Curly" in Winners and Sinners) was notably absent from the gang in this film, due to his commitments as a political activist. He is replaced in this film by Eric Tsang.

As with Heart of Dragon, Sammo Hung's real-life brother makes a cameo appearance as a henchman.

Sammo Hung - "Eric" / "Kidstuff" / "Fastbuck" / "Chi Koo Choi"
Sibelle Hu - "Barbara Woo" / "Swordflower" / "Ba Wong Fa"
Richard Ng - "Sandy" / "Dee"/ "Dai Sang Dei"
Charlie Chin - "Herb" (as Charlie Ching) "American Ginseng"/"Fa Kei Sam"
Eric Tsang - "Roundhead" / "Buddha Fruit" / "Lo Hon Gwo"
Stanley Fung - "Rawhide" / "Rhinohide" / "Sai Ngau Pei"
Jackie Chan - "Muscles"
Yuen Biao - "Ricky Fung"
Michiko Nishiwaki - Japanese Gang fighter
Cho Tat-wah - "Supt. Walter Tsao"
Paul Chang - Gang Chief
Dick Wei - gang member
Lam Ching-ying - gang member / Renegade Cop
Lau Kar-wing - gang member
James Tien - Parole Officer
Teresa Ha - Ping
Huang Ha - Prisoner No. 6377 (uncredited)
Tai San - Prisoner
San Kuai - Prisoner No. 5734
Bolo Yeung - Millionaire Chan (uncredited)
Alice Lau - Millionaire Chan's wife 
Ho Kai-law - Dentist
Fruit Chan - Card Player
Dick Tso - Card Player
Billy Lau - Mental patient on Bench
Lau Chau-sang - Bus Driver with Funny Hair
Yu Chi-ming - Man with Funny Hair
Chu Tau - Bus Driver with Funny Hair
Teddy Yip Wing-cho - Mental Patient with Sandy
Yuen Miu - Amusement Park Ninja
Chow Kam-kong - Gang Thug
Johnny Cheung - Gang Thug
Yuen Wah - Gang Thug (uncredited)
Lee Chi-kit - Gang Thug
Chin Kar-lok - Gang Thug / Masked Ninja at Muscles' home
Siu Tak-foo - Gang Thug
Chow Kong - Gang Thug (uncredited)
Pang Yun-cheung - Gang Thug
Wellson Chin - Dumb Gang Thug
Wong Kim-ban
Lung Ying
Wu Ma
Tau Cheung-yeung
Ng Hoi-ti

Box office
During its Hong Kong theatrical run, My Lucky Stars grossed HK $30,748,643. It was the first film to pass the HK $30 million mark in Hong Kong.

Accolades
1986 Hong Kong Film Awards
Nomination: Best Action Choreography (Yuen Biao, Lam Ching-ying)

Home media
On 23 September 2002, DVD was released by Hong Kong Legends at UK in Region 2.

See also

Jackie Chan filmography
Sammo Hung filmography
Yuen Biao filmography

References

External links

1984 films
1980s action comedy films
1980s buddy comedy films
1984 martial arts films
Buddy comedy films
1980s Cantonese-language films
Films directed by Sammo Hung
Films set in amusement parks
Films set in Hong Kong
Films set in Tokyo
Hong Kong gangster films
Golden Harvest films
Hong Kong action comedy films
Hong Kong buddy films
Hong Kong martial arts comedy films
Media Asia films
Police detective films
1984 comedy films
1980s Hong Kong films